The following are the football (soccer) events of the year 1975 throughout the world.

Events
European Cup 1975: Won by FC Bayern München after defeating Leeds United 1–0.
Copa Libertadores 1975: Won by Independiente after defeating Unión Española on an aggregate score of 2–0.
England: 1975 FA Cup Final: West Ham United 2, Fulham 0. (Alan Taylor 2)

Winners club national championship

Asia
 : Taj

Europe
: 1. FC Magdeburg
: Derby County F.C.
: AS Saint-Etienne 
 Hungary: Újpest FC
: Juventus

Eredivisie: PSV Eindhoven
Eerste Divisie: NEC Nijmegen
 : Ruch Chorzów
 Spain: Real Madrid
: Fenerbahçe
: Borussia Mönchengladbach
: Hajduk Split

North America
: Toluca
 / :
 Tampa Bay Rowdies (NASL)

South America
:
Metropolitano – River Plate
Nacional – River Plate
: Internacional
: Olimpia Asunción

International tournaments
 Copa América (July 17 – October 28, 1975)
 
 
  and 
 Pan American Games in Mexico (October 13 – October 25, 1975)
  and 
 —
 
1975 British Home Championship (May 17 – May 24, 1975)

Births
 January 1 – Bengt Sæternes, Norwegian footballer and manager
 January 12 – Rick Hoogendorp, Dutch footballer
 February 2 – Ieroklis Stoltidis, Greek footballer
 February 11 – Marek Špilár, Slovakian international footballer (died 2013)
 February 18 – Gary Neville, English footballer
 February 18 – Keith Gillespie, Irish footballer
 March 9 – Roy Makaay, Dutch footballer
 April 3 – Joakim Persson, Swedish footballer
 April 9 – Robbie Fowler, English footballer
 April 13 – Bruce Dyer, English footballer
 April 14 – Konstantinos Nebegleras, Greek footballer
 April 17 – Stefano Fiore, Italian footballer
 May 1 – Marc-Vivien Foé, Cameroonian international footballer (died 2003)
 May 2 – David Beckham, English international footballer
 May 8 – Dmitri Ustritski, Estonian international footballer
 May 25 – Raúl Muñoz, Chilean footballer
 June 9 – Paul Agostino, Australian footballer
 June 10 – Darren Eadie, English footballer
 June 18 – Aleksandrs Kolinko, Latvian footballer
 June 24 – Christie Rampone, US women's footballer
 June 27 – Timote Moleni, Tongan footballer and coach
 July 1 – Julio Briones, Ecuadorian footballer
 July 5 – Hernán Crespo, Argentinian international footballer
 July 22 – Marilia, Brazilian footballer
 August 16
Jonatan Johansson, Finnish footballer, coach, and manager
Pantelis Konstantinidis, Greek footballer
 August 28 – Serhiy Maherovych, retired Ukrainian professional footballer
 September 18 – Richard Appleby, English footballer
 September 18 – Carlos Armando Gruezo Quiñónez, Ecuadorian footballer
 September 19 – Oumar Bagayoko, Malian footballer
 October 21 – Henrique Hilário, Portuguese footballer
 October 30
 Dimitar Ivankov, Bulgarian footballer
 Alessandro Piovesan, Italian former footballer
 October 31 – Fabio Celestini, Swiss footballer
 November 12 – Balázs Kiskapusi, Hungarian former footballer
 November 13 – Quim, Portuguese footballer
 November 27 – Rain Vessenberg, Estonian footballer
 November 30 – Ben Thatcher, English footballer
 December 7 – Ivaylo Petkov, Bulgarian footballer
 December 11 – Dario Simic, Croatian footballer
 December 12 – Wesley Charles, Vincentian footballer
 December 20 – Bartosz Bosacki, Polish footballer
 December 27 – Martin Nash, Canadian footballer

Deaths

March
 March 31 – Virginio Rosetta, Italian defender, winner of the 1934 FIFA World Cup. (73)

July
 July 27 – Edmundo Piaggio, Argentine defender, runner-up of the 1930 FIFA World Cup. (69)

October
 October 27 – Peregrino Anselmo, Uruguayan striker, winner of the 1930 FIFA World Cup. (73)

November
 November 16 - Agustin Gomez Pagola, Spanish-born Soviet footballer, and plays as left back, and the part of the defender.

References

 
Association football by year